Verry Elleegant (foaled 12 October 2015) is a New Zealand-bred Australian-trained Thoroughbred racehorse that has won 11 Group One races. She was crowned the 2020/2021 Australian Racehorse of the Year, and was the winner of the 2021 Melbourne Cup and 2020 Caulfield Cup.

Background
Verry Elleegant is out of the New Zealand race mare Opulence, which was owned by her initial trainer, Nick Bishara.  After Opulence won two races she was sold at the 2011 Mixed Sale at Karaka to Don Goodwin, who is the owner of Very Elleegant's sire, Zed. The horse was named after Goodwin's granddaughter Ellee. Previously, he had named her brother "Verry Flash", adopting the "verry" spelling to be distinctive. Both Bishara and Goodwin struck up a friendship and raced Verry Elleegant until she was sold to clients of Australian trainer Darren Weir.

Racing career

2017/18: two-year-old season
Verry Elleegant made her racing debut on 7 July 2018. She finished second at Te Rapa Racecourse in New Zealand, ridden by Rowena Smyth in the Majestic Horse Floats Plate.

2018/19: three-year-old season
One month after her debut run, Verry Elleegant won her first race, a maiden, in convincing style at Ruakaka when ridden by Rowena Smyth. After producing a last to first victory, Smyth said after the race, "That was awesome the way she picked them up and flew past them. She just took off. Once she gets over a trip when she is older she is going to be a lovely filly."

After back-to-back wins with a further dominant victory at Matamata Racecourse in a benchmark 65 race, Verry Elleegant was sold and transferred to Australian trainer, Darren Weir, with the intention of the horse participating in the forthcoming Spring Racing Carnival. Darren Weir’s Australian clients purchased a fifty per cent share of the horse, with Jomara Bloodstock and the original ownership group retaining a 25 per cent share.

At her Australian debut, Verry Elleegant ran a luckless third placing in the Edward Manifold Stakes. Former trainer and part owner Nick Bishara said after the race, "It's a pity she didn't win, but still it was a top run and it showed she is up to the class over there." Despite the third placing, Verry Elleegant firmed into favouritism for the Group 1 VRC Oaks.

In what is considered a lead up to the Oaks, Verry Elleegant ran in the Ethereal Stakes. She raced fiercely in the early stages of the 2000-metre race, but rider John Allen settled her into a midfield position. Allen angled her out into clear space in the straight, and she stretched out to win by half a length.

Verry Elleegant finished unplaced in her next two starts, the Wakeful Stakes and the VRC Oaks. Following these runs she was removed from the stables of trainer Darren Weir, due to Police charging him with animal cruelty offences and conspiracy to defraud. She was transferred to the Sydney stables of trainer Chris Waller.

After a 3-month break Verry Elleegant was successful in two Group 1 races in succession, the Vinery Stud Stakes and the Australian Oaks.  After her win in the Oaks trainer Waller said, "That was a brilliant win. She’s a very exceptional filly and I think the best is yet to come."

2019/20: four-year-old season

Verry Elleegant returned to racing on 24 August 2019 however finished unplaced in the Winx Stakes. She then finished unplaced at her next start behind Avilius in the George Main Stakes. On 5 October she was a last stride winner in the Hill Stakes.
She then contested the 2019 Cox Plate at the odds of 20/1, however was beaten some 10 lengths by Japanese horse Lys Gracieux.  Jockey James McDonald said after the race, “It's probably a year too soon for her. She just doesn't execute well enough for a Cox Plate."

After a four month break, Verry Elleegant resumed racing on 15 February 2020 and was a fast finishing fourth behind Alizee in the Apollo Stakes. Two second placings followed in the Chipping Norton Stakes and the Ranvet Stakes before she won her third Group 1 race in the Tancred Stakes.

2020/21: five-year-old season
On 22 August 2020, Verry Elleegant returned to racing after a four month break in the Winx Stakes at Randwick. Starting the fourth favourite at odds of $7.50, she sat wide throughout the run and after hitting the front in the straight she was then clearly headed by stablemate Star Of The Seas. However under vigorous riding from jockey James McDonald, Verry Elleegant fought back to win the race by a narrow margin and captured her fourth Group 1 race.

On 19 September 2020, Verry Elleegant started the $2.20 favourite in the George Main Stakes at Randwick. She got back in the small field of only seven runners before jockey James McDonald went for a tight run in the straight, however he was forced back onto the fence by the Godolphin raced Oaks winner Colette. Eventually Verry Elleegant finished unplaced in fourth position but only beaten by just over a length margin by stable mate Kolding.

On 3 October 2020, Verry Elleegant had her next race in the Turnbull Stakes at Flemington.  Starting as the $5 favourite she won the race in a close finish with only one length separating the first six placings. This proved to be her fifth victory at Group 1 level. Trainer Chris Waller who trained the first three runners past the post said after the race, "She’s (Verry Elleegant) tough, she’s back on track and looking forward to the Caulfield Cup".

On October 17, Verry Elleegant started the $5 favourite in the Caulfield Cup. Ridden by Mark Zahra, she settled in the second half of the field throughout, before making her move 600 metres from the finish line.  After hitting the front in the home straight, she went head-to-head with Irish horse Anthony Van Dyck who drew level with her, however Verry Elleegant produced a late effort to win by a margin of a short neck.

On November 3, Verry Elleegant attempted to achieve the historic Caulfield Cup/Melbourne Cup double, but she finished seventh in the 2020 Melbourne Cup to Twilight Payment. She started from barrier 15 and carried 55.5 kg and was beaten just under 4 lengths.

On 13 February 2021 Verry Elleegant resumed racing in the Apollo Stakes at Randwick over 1,400 metres.  Starting the $2.50 favourite she finished in third placing, beaten just over 2 lengths by the Godolphin mare Colette.

On 27 February she was successful in her seventh Group 1 race when defeating the Godolphin horses Colette and Avilius in the Chipping Norton Stakes.

On 27 February she defeated Addeybb in the Ranvet Stakes.  Trainer Chris Waller described her after the race as being, "world-class”.

2021/22: six-year-old season
Verry Elleegant returned to racing after a 3 and a half month spell on 21 August 2021 in the Winx Stakes at Randwick. She started favourite at $4.20, but finished second by a quarter of a length to Mo'unga.

On 18 September she ran in the Group 1 George Main Stakes at Randwick. She started odds on favourite at $1.75 and won by a three-quarter length over Riodini.

On 2 October, she returned to defend her Turnbull Stakes victory the year prior at Flemington. She started as favourite at $2.10, ahead of Incentivise at $2.70. She jumped well, settling two out from the rail in fourth. She maintained this position until 500m to go, where she drew alongside the leaders four from the rail. She held here before being dropped at the 150m, eventually finishing 4th behind Incentivise, Young Werther and Chapada, three and a half lengths shy of the winner.

Verry Elleegant was placed third in the Cox Plate behind State Of Rest and Anamoe.

On 2 November she won the 2021 Melbourne Cup, ridden by James McDonald, ahead of Incentivise and Spanish Mission.  It was the first Melbourne Cup victory for both trainer Chris Waller and jockey James McDonald.

2022/23: seven-year-old season

In May 2022, Verry Elleegant was transferred to the Chantilly, France stable of Francis-Henri Graffard to build up for an attempt at the prestigious Prix de l'Arc de Triomphe at Longchamp Racecourse in October 2022 but was excluded from the race due to various conditions.

After a disappointing campaign in France and at Ascot Verry Ellegant was retired.

Racing summary 

The following are some of Verry Elleegant's races.
 

Source: Racingandsports, Racing.com profiles

Pedigree

Verry Elleegant is inbred 3 × 3 to Danehill, meaning that this stallion appears twice in the third generation of her pedigree. She is also inbred 4 × 4 to the mare Cotehele House.

Notes

References 

Racehorses bred in New Zealand
Racehorses trained in New Zealand
Racehorses trained in Australia
2015 racehorse births
Caulfield Cup winners
Thoroughbred family 9-c
Melbourne Cup winners